The Houston Beer Festival (also known as the Houston Beer Fest) is an annual beer festival held in Houston, Texas since 2011.
 
In 2020, the 10th annual event was to be moved to Labour Day weekend; but ended up being cancelled on grounds of COVID-19 pandemic. That was deferred to 2021.

References

External links

2011 establishments in Texas
Beer festivals in the United States
Festivals in Houston
Festivals established in 2011
Beer in Texas